Garmeh (formerly  - Jarmaq) is a city and capital of Garmeh County in North Khorasan Province, Iran. At the 2006 census, its population was 24,368, in 6,332 families.

References

Garmeh County

Cities in North Khorasan Province